The United Arab Emirates national under-17 basketball team is administered by United Arab Emirates Basketball Association.

Reference

External link
 Archived records of United Arab Emirates team participations

Men's national under-17 basketball teams
U-17